is a Japanese professional footballer who currently plays for Japanese club Omiya Ardija.

Formerly he played for Albirex Niigata (S) in the S.League, Singapore's top tier of competitive football.

Club career

Albirex Niigata (Singapore) FC
Atsushi Kawata signed for Albirex Niigata (S) for the 2015 S.League season. He made 30 appearances, scoring 11 goals in all competitions that season. He renewed his contract with the club for the 2016 S.League season. He was also part of the Albirex Niigata (S) squad that won both the 2015 Singapore Cup and the 2015 Singapore League Cup.

In the 2016 S.League season, Kawata was part of the team which completed an unprecedented sweep of all four of the league's major trophies. As a result, he was named the 2016 S.League Player of the Year, scoring 20 goals and contributing eight assists in all competitions.

Albirex Niigata FC
After a stellar 2016 season in Singapore, Kawata earned a move back to parent club Albirex Niigata for the 2017 J-League One season.

He scored the 1st goal for the club against Hokkaido Consadole Sapporo on 23/9/2017. In the match, he scored twice and this is 1st time he started the match for the team.  He also scored on 21/10/2017 against Júbilo Iwata.

Tokushima Vortis
For season 2019, he moved to Tokushima Vortis.

Career statistics
Statistics accurate as of 1 Oct 2022

Honours

Club
Albirex Niigata (S)
S.League (1): 2016
Singapore Cup (2): 2015, 2016
Singapore League Cup (2): 2015, 2016
Singapore Charity Shield (1): 2016

Individual 
S.League Player of the Year: 2016

References

External links 

1992 births
Living people
Association football people from Osaka Prefecture
People from Fujiidera, Osaka
Japanese footballers
Singapore Premier League players
Albirex Niigata Singapore FC players
J1 League players
J2 League players
Albirex Niigata players
Tokushima Vortis players
Omiya Ardija players
Association football midfielders